Christianity in West Bengal, India, is a minority religion. According to the 2011 census of India, there were 658,618 Christians in West Bengal, or 0.72% of the population. Although Mother Teresa worked in Kolkata (Calcutta), Christianity is a minority religion in Kolkata as well. West Bengal has the highest number of Bengali Christians. Bengali Christians have been established since the 16th century with the advent of the Portuguese in Bengal. Later in the 19th and 20th centuries, many upper-class Bengalis converted to Christianity during the Bengali Renaissance under British rule, including Krishna Mohan Banerjee, Michael Madhusudan Dutt, Anil Kumar Gain, and Gnanendramohan Tagore. Aurobindo Nath Mukherjee was the first Indian to be Anglican Bishop of Calcutta.

Bengali Christians are considered a model minority, due to their significant contributions to Bengali culture and society for the past two centuries. They are considered to be among the most progressive communities in Bengal, and have the highest literacy rate, the lowest male-female sex ratio, along with better socio-economic status. Christian missionaries run major social institutions dealing with education and healthcare, such as those run by the Jesuit Catholics, and the dominant Protestant Church of North India (CNI), & some Christian Revival Church also serving.

History
Christianity has been present in Bengal since the 16th century. The Portuguese established a settlement in Bandel, Hooghly district in the 16th century, and Bandel Church, perhaps the first church in West Bengal, was built in 1599. Burnt down during the sacking of Hooghly in 1632, the church was rebuilt in 1660. The followers of Christianity mainly settled in Barddhmann, Bankura, Kolkata and Hooghly district of West Bengal.
Many Bengali Catholics have Portuguese surnames.

British missionary William Carey, who founded the Baptist Missionary Society, travelled to India in 1793 and worked as a missionary in the Danish colony of Serampore, because of opposition from the East India Company to his activities in their regions. He translated the Bible into Bengali (completed 1809) and Sanskrit (completed 1818). His first Bengali convert was Krishna Pal, who renounced his caste after conversion. In 1818, the first theological college in Bengal, Serampore College, was founded.

Denominations
St. Paul's Cathedral, Kolkata is the seat of the Anglican Diocese of Calcutta (1813) of the Church of North India. The Roman Catholic ecclesiastical province which has its seat in 
the Cathedral of the Most Holy Rosary is the Roman Catholic Archdiocese of Calcutta (1834).

Other denominations include:
Assemblies of God in India
India Pentecostal Church of God
Armenian Apostolic Church
Bethel Apostolic Assemblies(IBAA) India
Bengal Orissa Bihar Baptist Convention
Brethren in Christ Church in India
Church of God (Anderson)
Council of Baptist Churches in Northern India
El Shaddai
New Life Fellowship Association
United Missionary Church of India
Christian Revival Church (CRC)

Population

Notable Institutions

Schools
Armenian College and Philanthropic Academy (Armenian Apostolic Church and Orthodox)
Assembly of God Church School (Pentecostal and Protestant)
Calcutta Boys School  ( Thoburn Methodist church)
Calcutta Girls High School ( Thoburn Methodist church)
Don Bosco High & Technical School, Liluah (Salesian and Catholic)
Don Bosco School, Park Circus (Salesian and Catholic)
Don Bosco School, Bandel (Salesian and Catholic)
La Martiniere Calcutta (Church of North India and Protestant)
Loreto Schools, Kolkata (Catholic)
Scottish Church Collegiate School (Church of North India and Protestant)
St. James' School (Church of North India and Protestant)
St. John's Diocesan Girls' Higher Secondary School (Church of North India and Protestant)
St. Lawrence High School, Kolkata (Jesuit and Catholic)
St Thomas School, Kolkata (Church of North India and Protestant)
St. Xavier's Collegiate School (Jesuit and Catholic)
The Frank Anthony Public School, Kolkata (Non-denominational and Protestant)

Colleges and Universities
Loreto College, Kolkata (Catholic)
Scottish Church College (Church of North India and Protestant)
Senate of Serampore College (University) (Non-denominational and Protestant)
Serampore College (Non-denominational and Protestant)
South Asia Theological Research Institute (Non-denominational and Protestant)
St. Paul's Cathedral Mission College (Church of North India and Protestant)
St. Thomas' College of Engineering and Technology (Church of North India and Protestant)
St. Xavier's College, Kolkata (Jesuit and Catholic)
Women's Christian College, Kolkata (Non-denominational and Protestant)

Notable people

Mother Teresa
Henry Derozio, poet
Brahmabandhav Upadhyay, theologian
Badal Sircar, noted Bengali playwright and dramatist.
Neil O'Brien 
Leander Paes
Leslie Claudius
Derek O'Brien
Michael Madhusudan Dutt
Toru Dutt
Kali Charan Banerjee
Krishna Mohan Banerjee
Harendra Coomar Mookerjee
John Sharat Chandra Banerjee 
Sukumari Bhattacharji, Indologist
Lionel Protip Sen, General in the Indian Army
K. P. Aleaz, theologian and retired Professor, Bishop's College
Bonita Aleaz, political scientist
 Enrico Piperno, tennis player(1982 Asian Games), India's former Davis Cup and Fed Cup coach.
 Joy Govinda Shome, theologian and founder of Calcutta Christo Samaj in 1887.

See also
 
 List of Christian denominations in North East India
 Christian Revival Church

References
 

 
 

 
Christianity in India